Lauwersmeer National Park is a national park in the provinces of Friesland and Groningen in the Netherlands. It consists of the southern and eastern parts of the Lauwersmeer (previously Lauwerszee). As part of the Dutch Wadden Sea Conservation Area, it was inscribed on the UNESCO World Heritage List for its outstanding biodiversity and its large, relatively pristine intertidal ecosystem.

Geography 
In the north of the Netherlands, the Lauwers river forms part of the east-west border between the provinces of Friesland and Groningen. The Lauwers flows from south to north into the Wadden Sea. The Lauwersmeer is its estuary, which is connected to the sea via a sluice at Lauwersoog. The national park consists of most of the Lauwersmeer and is situated in the Frisian municipalities of Dongeradeel and Kollumerland c.a. in Friesland and the Groningen municipality of De Marne.

History
On 25 May 1969, the Lauwers Sea was enclosed and separated from the Wadden Sea, since then it has been called Lauwersmeer.

The Lauwersmeer gradually became a freshwater lake and new flora and fauna appeared. To protect this new and young nature area, the Lauwersmeer became a national park on 12 November 2003.

Fauna and flora

Among the flora are the purple Dactylorhiza maculata and the white Parnassia.

Among the birds living in the area are the Eurasian Spoonbill, the Montagu's Harrier, the Bearded Reedling, and the Bluethroat. For the winter, hundred thousands of birds migrate to the area, like the Eurasian Wigeon, the Tundra Swan, and the Barnacle Goose.

To keep the landscape open, big grazers are used like the Konik horses and Highland cattle, besides normal horses and cows.

References

External links

Official website
An entry by the International Dark-Sky Association

Protected areas established in 2003
2003 establishments in the Netherlands
National parks of the Netherlands
Ramsar sites in the Netherlands
Geography of Friesland
Geography of Groningen (province)
Tourist attractions in Friesland
Tourist attractions in Groningen (province)
Het Hogeland
Noardeast-Fryslân